Paradise for Sailors is a 1959 West German comedy film directed by Harald Reinl and starring Margit Saad, Boy Gobert and Mara Lane.

The film's sets were designed by the art director Willi Herrmann. The film was shot at Tempelhof Studios and on location in Rio de Janeiro.

Cast

References

Bibliography

External links 
 

1959 films
1959 musical comedy films
German musical comedy films
West German films
1950s German-language films
Films directed by Harald Reinl
Films based on German novels
Seafaring films
Treasure hunt films
Films set on uninhabited islands
Films shot in Brazil
Films shot at Tempelhof Studios
UFA GmbH films
1950s German films